Mojtaba Zonnour (also spelled Zolnour) is an Iranian Shi'a cleric and conservative politician who, represents Qom in the Iranian Parliament. He declared that he was SARS-CoV-2-positive on 27 February 2020.

Political roles
Zonnour was formerly Supreme Leader's Deputy Representative to the Islamic Revolutionary Guard Corps.

Zonnour was the chairman of the Nuclear Subcommittee of the National Security and Foreign Policy Committee in the Islamic Consultative Assembly until 2019. He is currently the head of Commission of National-Security and Foreign-Policy (of Islamic Parliament of I.R.Iran).

Electoral history

Personal life
On 27 February 2020, after the COVID-19 pandemic became known to have spread to Iran, Zonnour stated that he had been infected with SARS-CoV-2, the virus that causes coronavirus disease 2019. He called for Iranians to remain calm.

References 

 Official Biography  

Deputies of Qom
Front of Islamic Revolution Stability politicians
People from Malayer
Living people
1963 births
Members of the 10th Islamic Consultative Assembly
Popular Front of Islamic Revolution Forces politicians
Islamic Revolutionary Guard Corps personnel of the Iran–Iraq War
Islamic Revolutionary Guard Corps clerics